Michael Conner Humphreys (born March 1, 1985) is an American actor best known for playing young Forrest Gump in the 1994 film of the same name, a performance for which he was nominated for a Young Artist Award.

Biography
Humphreys was born in the small town of Independence, Mississippi. In 1993, when he was eight years old, he attended an open casting call in Memphis, Tennessee for "a young Tom Hanks with light eyes and a quirky disposition." The casting team, particularly taken by his thick Southern accent, selected Humphreys to play the role of young Forrest Gump in the movie adaptation of Winston Groom's 1986 novel. As part of his preparation to play the character as an adult, Tom Hanks worked to emulate Humphreys's speech and mannerisms.

Alongside his Forrest Gump costars Hanna Hall and Haley Joel Osment, he received a nomination at the 16th Youth in Film Awards, though he was ultimately bested in his category by Matthew McCurley from the movie North. Save for high school productions and an uncredited role in the 2003 television adaptation of the John Grisham novel A Painted House, Humphreys did not pursue a further career in acting.

Following high school, Humphreys enlisted in the United States Army in November 2004. He was stationed in Germany, and, assigned to the 1st Battalion 36th Infantry Regiment, an element of the 1st Armored Division, he completed an 18-month deployment in Anbar Province, Iraq. Following his return to the United States and some time at Fort Riley in Kansas, Humphreys completed his service on June 4, 2008.

In 2008, he was studying at the University of North Alabama. In 2011, he played the role of "Eddie" in the independent World War II film Pathfinders: In the Company of Strangers.

Humphreys more recently worked security for Vancouver Transportation System.  As of 2020 he was working as an online teacher.

Filmography

Film

Television

Accolades

References

External links

1985 births
20th-century American male actors
21st-century American male actors
United States Army personnel of the Iraq War
American male child actors
Living people
Male actors from Mississippi
Military personnel from Mississippi
United States Army soldiers
University of North Alabama alumni